Senicide, or geronticide, is the killing of the elderly, or their abandonment to death.

Philosophical views 

Pythagorean doctrine held that all creatures were being punished by the gods who imprisoned the creatures' souls in a body.  Thus, any attempt to alter this punishment would be seen as a direct violation of the gods' wills.  In the fourth century BC, the Hippocratic Oath was developed and reads, "I will not give a fatal draught to anyone if I am asked, nor will I suggest any such thing."  Through the lens of the Hippocratic Oath, euthanasia by means of a fatal draught was forbidden.  However, one of the most famous examples of deviation from this code occurred when the physician of Seneca, a philosopher and tutor of Nero, provided the scholar, who was 69 years old at the time, with poison for one of his many failed attempts at suicide.

Religious views 

Greco-Roman society was dominated by religious faith that did not categorically condemn suicide and euthanasia, and the Jewish history was replete with heroic suicides. By contrast, as the Islamo-Christian worldview took hold, the practices of suicide and senicide became detestable, as they preached only God should have control over a person's life and death.

By culture

Heruli
The Heruli were a Germanic tribe during the Migration Period (about 400 to 800 CE). Procopius states in his work The Wars, that the Heruli placed the sick and elderly on a tall stack of wood and stabbed them to death before setting the pyre alight.

India 
In the southern Indian state of Tamil Nadu, the illegal practice of senicide – known locally as thalaikoothal – is said to occur dozens or perhaps hundreds of times each year. It seems as if the old ones have accepted their death already "as they also think that they have become a burden for their children." A lady from the village Subamma argues, "What else can they do if they see their parents suffering? At least they are offering their parents a peaceful death. It is an act of dignity because living like a piece of log for years is disrespectful for the elderly themselves, more than it is for us. The elderly chooses to be offered thalaikoothal, too". Meanwhile, the old custom is replaced or reinforced by lethal injections and some old people might escape the unconstitutional custom. "The practice of thalaikoothal is unconstitutional. As no one in India is allowed to commit suicide and even in euthanasia, only passive euthanasia is allowed, therefore, in no way thalaikoothal, killing old aged parents, can be practiced".

Herodotus says of the Padeans of India:

Inuit 
In earlier times Inuit would leave their elderly on the ice to die but it was rare, except during famines. The last known case of Inuit senicide was in 1939.

Japan
Ubasute (姥捨, 'abandoning an old woman'), a custom allegedly performed in Japan in the distant past, whereby an infirm or elderly relative was carried to a mountain, or some other remote, desolate place, and left there to die. This custom has been vividly depicted in The Ballad of Narayama (a 1956 novel by Shichirō Fukazawa, a 1958 film, and a 1983 film).

Korea
According to some beliefs, in ancient Korea it was the tradition to abandon one's parents on a mountainside if they were over 70 years of age. An old woman would be taken to a cave in the mountains, and left with a small pot of rice. It has been believed that caves containing human remains and the characteristic small rice pot are evidence of that practice. "Burying Old Alive" is a 1963 Korean movie that references this idea.

Scandinavia

In Nordic folklore, the ättestupa is a cliff where elderly people were said to leap, or be thrown, to death. While the practice has no historical evidence, the trope has survived as an urban legend, and a metaphor for deficient welfare for the elderly.

Serbia

Lapot is a mythical Serbian practice of disposing of one's parents.

Greece
Parkin provides eighteen cases of senicide which the people of antiquity believed happened.  Of these cases, only two of them occurred in Greek society; another took place in Roman society, while the rest happened in other cultures. One example that Parkin provides is of the island of Keos in the Aegean Sea. Although many different variations of the Keian story exist, the legendary practice may have begun when the Athenians besieged the island.  In an attempt to preserve the food supply, the Keians voted for all people over 60 years of age to commit suicide by drinking hemlock. The other case of Roman senicide occurred on the island of Sardinia, where human sacrifices of 70-years-old fathers were made by their sons to the titan Cronus.

Rome
The case of institutionalized senicide occurring in Rome comes from a proverb stating that 60-year-olds were to be thrown from the bridge. Whether or not this act occurred in reality was highly disputed in antiquity and continues to be doubted today. The most comprehensive explanation of the tradition comes from Festus writing in the fourth century AD who provides several different beliefs of the origin of the act, including human sacrifice by ancient Roman natives, a Herculean association, and the notion that older men should not vote because they no longer provided a duty to the state. This idea to throw older men into the river probably coincides with the last explanation given by Festus. That is, younger men did not want the older generations to overshadow their wishes and ambitions and, therefore, suggested that the old men should be thrown off the bridge, where voting took place, and not be allowed to vote.

Scythians 
Aelian writes: The Derbiccae (a tribe, apparently of Scythian origin, settled in Margiana, on the left bank of the Oxus) kill those who are seventy years of age. They sacrifice the men and strangle the women.

Herodotus tells us about the Massagetae that: "Though they fix no certain term to life, yet when a man is very old all his family meet together and kill him, with beasts of the flock besides, then boil the flesh and feast on it. This is held to be the happiest death; when a man dies of an illness, they do not eat him, but bury him in the earth, and lament that he did not live to be killed."

Contemporary Culture 
In modern-day western-culture, senicide often takes the form of placing senior citizens in overcrowded conditions where preventable diseases can easily spread. More often than not, these spaces are separate from other generations of people so problems such as quality of life, hygiene and isolation are less detectable to the wider population.

In fiction
Works of fiction which have dealt with senicide include:
 Dinosaurs season-one episode, "Hurling Day"
 The Old Law, a 17th-century tragicomedy written by Thomas Middleton, William Rowley, and Philip Massinger
 Anthony Trollope's 1882 dystopian novel, The Fixed Period
 Jack London's 1901 short story, The Law of Life
 Keisuke Kinoshita's The Ballad of Narayama (1958)
 Korean director Kim Ki-young's Goryeojang (1963)
 Shōhei Imamura's The Ballad of Narayama, which won the Palme d'Or in 1983
 North
 Christopher Buckley's 2007 novel, Boomsday.
 Isaac Asimov's novel, Pebble in the Sky
 Star Trek: The Next Generation season-four episode "Half a Life"
 The Giver, by Lois Lowry
 This Perfect Day by Ira Levin - at the age of about 62
 The Tripods, a series of young adult fiction novels by John Christopher
 Norsemen, a Norwegian comedy TV series
 Midsommar, a film by Ari Aster
 K.D., a Tamil-language film by director Madhumitha
 Baaram or The Burden, a National Award winning Tamil-language film by director Priya Krishnaswamy
 Logan's Run (film)

See also
 Assisted suicide
 Involuntary euthanasia
 Granny dumping
 Matricide
 Patricide

References

Further reading
 Aristotle;  Nicomachean Ethics (5.11)
 Plutarch.  Themistocles

Killings by type
 
Old age